Nova FM was a radio station based in Windhoek, Namibia. It went on air since for the first time on 30 November 1998, broadcasting nationally. In 2017, the radio station relaunched as JACC, with a music-only format designed to appeal to mature adults in Namibia.
JACC moved to digital streaming-only in 2020, and the station's FM broadcasting was rebranded to Nova 103.5 - a bilingual soft AC station.

References

Radio stations in Namibia
Mass media in Windhoek
Radio stations established in 1998